John Morton (born February 17, 1942) is an American racing driver from Waukegan, Illinois.

Early life 
After his father took him to a race at Road America in 1957, Morton became an avid racing fan. He went on to race jalopies in South Carolina before he dropped out of Clemson University to attend Carroll Shelby's racing school at Riverside Raceway in California. Taking a menial job working in Carroll Shelby's race shop, Morton saved his money to purchase his first race car, a Lotus Super 7 which he raced in SCCA (Sports Car Club of America) amateur races in 1963.

Career 
In 1964, he drove with Ken Miles at Sebring in a 427 Cobra for Shelby American Racing. Teaming with Miles and Skip Scott, Morton won the GT class at the Road America 500, second overall, in a team Cobra. That year, he bought his second race car, a Lotus 23B.

John raced mostly SCCA Club races through 1968 until Peter Brock (the American designer, motorsports writer and photographer, not the Australian racer) hired him for his new BRE Datsun team. The period between 1969 and 1972 was fruitful for John, Peter and Datsun. The team disbanded after the 1972 season after dominating both SCCA C Production with the 240Z (National Championships in 1970-71) and the 2.5 Trans-Am with the 510.

Racing in F5000, Can-Am and IMSA occupied the next few years. A short almost accidental foray into the movie industry in 1975 led to stunt work on films and several TV shows, including The Rockford Files and Fantasy Island. In 1981, Phil Conte joined John's small Can-Am team as a sponsor for two years after which Phil formed his own IMSA team with John as one of his two drivers in the GTP category.

In 1985, Jim Busby hired John as team driver in one of his BF Goodrich sponsored Porsche 962s with Pete Halsmer. The pair won the Times GP at Riverside in 1985. In 1987 John drove for the Group 44 Jaguar team of Bob Tullius and won the last Times GP at Riverside and the West Palm Beach GP, both sharing the car with Hurley Haywood. The Walkinshaw team replaced Tullius' Jaguar team for 1988 and the Electramotive Nissan Team signed Morton. John and Geoff Brabham won several races that year setting the stage for Nissan's domination of the IMSA series for several years.

Other notable Nissan races for John during 1989–95 include an overall victory at Sebring and several class wins, including Le Mans. Morton was third overall in a Joest Porsche in 1986 and class winner in a BFG Mazda Lola in 1984, competing nine times at Le Mans. Several races in various other classes and categories include Sprint cars and karts. He made his CART debut in the first race of the 1984 season at the Long Beach Grand Prix and finished 9th but was never able to get a ride in competitive car.

In his most recent professional races, 1997–2001, John raced Porsches in both the Grand Am Rolex Sports Car Series and American Le Mans Series. Currently most of John's competition is in vintage races driving a variety of cars, which include Cobra coupes, Corvettes, Porsches, and a Sunbeam Tiger.

Morton has competed at the Monterey Historic Automobile Races many times. In 2010, he suffered a crash when his Scarab flipped end-over-end near turn two of Mazda Raceway Laguna Seca, landing upside down with a broken roll bar. He was taken to the hospital, and was determined to be fine. The Scarab was seriously damaged, but it was rebuilt and restored to original specifications and recently won the Amelia Island Concours.

In 2013, the Sports Car Club of America held the 50th Running of the National Runoffs. Because of this momentous event special rules were in place to allow former champions to enter the event without running any of that season's qualifying events. Bonk Brothers Racing and LNA Enterprises prepared a Nissan 240Z for Morton to run at the event. Due to poor weather he was only able to have 2 sessions in the car. He was able to qualify 13th and finish 10th.

In 2013, Motorbooks published John’s first person account: “Inside Shelby American - Wrenching and Racing with Carroll Shelby in the 1960s."

Racing record

SCCA National Championship Runoffs

24 Hours of Le Mans results

References

External links

John Morton Racing

1942 births
Champ Car drivers
Trans-Am Series drivers
Living people
24 Hours of Le Mans drivers
American Le Mans Series drivers
Sportspeople from Waukegan, Illinois
Racing drivers from Illinois
World Sportscar Championship drivers
SCCA Formula Super Vee drivers
SCCA National Championship Runoffs winners
12 Hours of Sebring drivers
Oreca drivers
Team Joest drivers